was a town located in Yama District, Fukushima Prefecture, Japan. The town was established as a village in 1875, and promoted to a town in 1954.

As of 2003, the town had an estimated population of 4,092 and a density of 26.20 persons per square kilometer. The total area was 156.21 km².

On January 4, 2006, Yamato, along with the town of Shiokawa, and the villages of Atsushiokanō and Takasato (all from Yama District), was merged into the expanded city of Kitakata.

External links
Yamato official website in Japanese

Dissolved municipalities of Fukushima Prefecture
Kitakata, Fukushima